Gladys May Casely-Hayford alias Aquah Laluah (11 May 1904 – October 1950) was a Gold Coast-born Sierra Leonean writer. She is credited as the first author to write in the Krio language.

Early life and career
Gladys was born into the Casely-Hayford family of Axim, Gold Coast on 11 May 1904. As a child, known then as Aquah LaLuah, she was a voracious reader, devouring Charles Kingsley's Heroes at the age of seven. She could sing, dance, and write poetry at an early age. Due to her upbringing she could speak fluent English, Creole, and Fante (the language of her father). She had her primary and secondary school education in Gold Coast but for medical reasons was taken to England, and was then educated in Europe, including at Penrhos College, Colwyn Bay, in Wales, then travelled with a Berlin jazz band as a dancer. She travelled in the US as well. When she started having breakdowns in 1932 she had to go home. Back home in Africa, she taught at the Girls' Vocational School in Freetown, Sierra Leone, run by her mother, Adelaide Casely-Hayford.

Later life and work
Acquah Laluah married Arthur Hunter. At the school she taught African Folklore and Literature. Very aware of her African background, she celebrated her blackness in poems including "Rejoice" and "Nativity". Although not much of her poetry was published during her lifetime, many of her poems were anthologized in the 1960s. Poems such as "Nativity" (1927), "The Serving Girl" (1941) and "Creation" (1926), have been widely anthologized; writers from the Harlem Renaissance loved her work.

Death
Gladys May Casely-Hayford lived in Freetown, Sierra Leone, for much of her life. She moved to Accra, where her father's family lived, and where she died in 1950 of blackwater fever.

Works
Take'Um So, 1948 (poetry)

Notes

1904 births
1950 deaths
Sierra Leone Creole people
Sierra Leonean women writers
Sierra Leonean women poets
20th-century women writers
20th-century Sierra Leonean poets
Ghanaian women poets
20th-century Ghanaian poets
Sierra Leonean people of Jamaican descent
Sierra Leonean people of British descent
People of Jamaican Maroon descent
Sierra Leoneans of Jamaican Maroon descent
Sierra Leonean people of Ghanaian descent
Ghanaian people of Jamaican descent
Ghanaian people of English descent
Ghanaian people of Sierra Leonean descent
Gladys
Krio-language writers
Fante people
Ghanaian people of Irish descent
Emigrants from Gold Coast (British colony) to Sierra Leone